A fautasi (also fa'utasis) is a Samoan boat, similar to a longboat. Fautasi boats are around 100 feet in length and can accommodate a rowing crew of 50. A coxwain uses a drum to beat a tempo to coordinate the rowing. Each fautasi also has a captain. The meaning of fautasi is "to build as one," which reflects the need for teamwork in using the boats. Prior to the use of modern-day ferries, fautasi were the main mode of transport between Upolu and Savai'i. 

Today fautasi are mainly used in racing events. Traditionally, men involved in the racing spent eight weeks away from their families and other luxuries, and training with their captain. The races take place during Independence Days week celebrations in June. The top three finalists in the races receives a cash prize from the Government of Samoa. The sport used to be male-only, but in 2013, there was an all-women crew. The first woman to become a fautasi skipper was Zita Martel in 2001. Entrants from Samoa, American Samoa, Tonga and Hawaii have participated.

Fautasi are made of hollowed-out trees.

References

External links 
 Zita Martel, First Woman to Captain a Winning Fautasi (2012 video)

Boats
Samoan culture